Alopecosa is a species of wolf spiders in the genus Alopecosa with a palearctic distribution.

It was described in chapter 5 of the book Svenska Spindlar of the Swedish arachnologist and entomologist Carl Alexander Clerck.

See also 
 List of Lycosidae species
 Biota of the Isle of Man

References

External links 

pulverulenta
Spiders of Europe
Spiders described in 1757
Taxa named by Carl Alexander Clerck
Palearctic spiders